Bakertown or Bakerstown may refer to:

Bakertown, Indiana
Bakertown, Michigan
Bakerstown, Pennsylvania